Shcherbinka is a town, formerly in Moscow Oblast, Russia, and since July 1, 2012 a federal city subject (settlement) of Moscow, Russia. Population:

History
It was founded in the late 14th century as a village of Shcherbinino and granted town status in 1975.

In 1984, the western part of Shcherbinka was transferred to Moscow and is currently a part of Yuzhnoye Butovo District.

Administrative and municipal status
Within the framework of administrative divisions, it was incorporated as Shcherbinka Town Under Oblast Jurisdiction—an administrative unit with the status equal to that of the districts. As a municipal division, Shcherbinka Town Under Oblast Jurisdiction was incorporated as Shcherbinka Urban Okrug.

On July 1, 2012, Shcherbinka was transferred to the federal city of Moscow and became a part of Novomoskovsky Administrative Okrug.

Notable residents 

Maxim Andriyanov (born 1980), sledge hockey player 
Nikolay Kozlov (born 1972), water polo player

References

Notes

Sources

External links
Sightseeing in Shcherbinka and around. Acquaintance with the town.

Cities and towns in Moscow (federal city)
Novomoskovsky Administrative Okrug
Shcherbinka Settlement